Sunita Dangol (born 18 May 1993) is a Nepalese politician, Newa heritage conservationist, language activist, and media professional. She is currently serving as the deputy mayor of Kathmandu metropolitan city, the capital city of Nepal. She assumed office on 30 May 2022, alongside mayor Balen Shah.

Biography 
Dangol was born to father Satu Dangol and mother Sangita Dangol in Kathmandu, Nepal. In 2011, she won the Miss Newa pageantry. 

Before being elected as the deputy mayor of Kathmandu, she was active as a Newa heritage conservationist and indigenous–script (Ranjana) activist.

2022 Kathmandu municipal election 

Dangol initially declared her candidacy for the position of Mayor as an independent candidate for the 2022 Kathmandu municipal election. However, she joined the CPN (UML) and competed for the position of deputy mayor with Keshav Sthapit in the mayor's post. She was elected with 68,612 votes while Rameshwar Shrestha of the coalition's Unified Socialists polled 23,806 votes.

References 

1993 births
Living people
21st-century Nepalese women politicians
21st-century Nepalese politicians
People from Kathmandu
Newar people
Nepal Bhasa movement
Communist Party of Nepal (Unified Marxist–Leninist) politicians
Alumni of Purbanchal University
Tribhuvan University alumni